Big Town Scandal is a 1948 American crime film directed by William C. Thomas and written by Milton Raison. The film stars Phillip Reed, Hillary Brooke, Stanley Clements, Darryl Hickman, Carl Switzer and Roland Dupree. It was released on May 27, 1948 by Paramount Pictures. The film was the fourth and last one in a series of four films based on the long-running radio program Big Town.

Plot
After juvenile boys get caught robbing a sporting goods store, reporter Lorelei Kilbourne pleads for leniency in court and her boss and boyfriend, editor Steve Wilson, ends up reluctantly vouching for the boys. He converts an old newspaper building into a recreation center, where he coaches the boys in basketball. Tommy Malone goes for a joy ride in the car of a gangster, Joe Moreley. A business arrangement is struck, where Moreley will stash stolen goods at the rec center while betting on the team's basketball games, which Tommy will deliberately lose.

The other boys try to return some stolen furs, but one of them, Pinky Jones, ends up shot. Tommy tries to end his deal with Moreley, only to be threatened by Cato, the gangster's gunman. Tommy double-crosses the crooks, winning the next game. Cato shoots him. Tommy's friend and teammate "Dum Dum" pursues Moreley in the bleachers, where Moreley falls off. Tommy recovers in the hospital, while Steve and Lorelei end up getting custody of three more delinquent boys.

Cast  
Phillip Reed as Steve Wilson
Hillary Brooke as Lorelei Kilbourne
Stanley Clements as Tommy Malone
Darryl Hickman as Harold 'Skinny' Peters
Carl Switzer as Frankie Snead
Roland Dupree as John 'Pinky' Jones 
Tommy Bond as Waldo 'Dum Dum' Riggs
Vince Barnett as Louie Snead 
Charles Arnt as Amos Peabody
Joseph Allen as Wally Blake 
Donna Martell as Marion Harrison 
John Phillips as Joe Moreley
Reginald Billado as Cato

See also  
Big Town radio series

References

External links 
 

1948 films
1948 crime drama films
American black-and-white films
American crime drama films
Films about journalists
Films based on radio series
Films directed by William C. Thomas
Paramount Pictures films
1940s English-language films
1940s American films
Big Town